Monte Linzone is a mountain of Lombardy, Italy. It is located within the Bergamasque Prealps.

Mountains of the Alps
Mountains of Lombardy